Steven John Price  (born 12 March 1974) is an Australian former professional rugby league footballer who played in the 1990s and 2000s. An Australian international representative, he retired as Queensland's most capped State of Origin forward. Price captained Sydney club, the Canterbury-Bankstown Bulldogs (with whom he won the 1995 and 2004 premierships) as well as New Zealand NRL club, the Warriors.

Background
Born in Dalby, Queensland, Price grew up in Toowoomba, where he attended Harristown State High School. Price was spotted playing rugby league for the Newtown Lions club in Toowoomba and was signed to the New South Wales Rugby League premiership club, Sydney's Canterbury-Bankstown Bulldogs.

Playing career

Canterbury-Bankstown

During the 1994 NSWRL season Price made his first grade debut for Canterbury-Bankstown at Belmore Sports Ground on 3 July against the Balmain Tigers. It was a great rookie year for Price as his side finished the regular season as minor premiers on top of the ladder and eventually going on to reach the 1994 Grand Final which they lost to Mal Meninga's Canberra Raiders. The disappointment of losing the Grand Final did not last long for Price, as the following year in the 1995 season, Canterbury reached their second consecutive Grand Final to come up against the Manly-Warringah Sea Eagles. Price was named on the starting line-up and as a headgear-wearing second-rower scored the first try of the game which Canterbury eventually won 17–4, giving Price his first taste of premiership victory.  The experience of finals football so early in his career was a positive for Price as he established a reputation as an effective front rower/prop and second rower with a high work rate.

During the 1998 season Price made his debut for Queensland in game one of the 1998 State of Origin series. He would retain his spot for the following two matches of series in which Queensland were victorious two games to one. His performance at representative level was then awarded with the highest honour for an Australian player as he was announced in the 1998 Kangaroos squad. In the same year Steve Price and Canterbury-Bankstown made a terrific finals run where, after finishing the season in 9th position, they won four must-win matches to make it all the way through to the 1998 NRL Grand Final against the Brisbane Broncos which they lost 38–12.

When Canterbury captain Darren Britt left the club at the end of 2001, coach Steve Folkes opted for Price to captain the side for 2002. He proved to be a great captain and Canterbury finished the 2002 season with 20 wins, 1 draw and only 3 losses, although they would not play in the finals due to the salary cap breach. 2003 was another strong year for Price as he was awarded Player of the Year by magazine Rugby League Week; he also captained the sides to 18 regular season wins and a semi-final berth which they lost to the Sydney Roosters. In 2004 Price had a stellar performance playing for Queensland and was awarded the Ron McAuliffe Medal for Queensland player of the series.

During the transfer period in 2004 it was announced that it would be his last year with Canterbury after ten years of service, as he was signing with the New Zealand Warriors for 2005. Price could not have gone out in better style as Canterbury finished second on the ladder, missing out on the minor premiership by points difference. Price's fairytale ending was then shattered when he tore his medial ligament the week before the Grand Final. His side played well without their inspirational captain and went on to win 16–13 to send Price out with another Grand Final success, even though he did not compete in the final game.

New Zealand Warriors 

When Price left Canterbury, who had appeared in the finals consistently and performed very well, he went to join the Warriors who had experienced their worst ever season in 2004, finishing 14th of 15 teams and winning only 6 games all year. Price was straight-away appointed captain of the squad and he clearly made some sort of impact as the team remained competitive for all of their matches. In the opening match of the 2005 State of Origin series Price was named man of the match. The Warriors had a good chance to make the finals; however, a four-match losing streak late in the season removed those chances and they finished the 2005 season 11th, a slight improvement from the previous year.

In 2006 Price again experienced more salary cap drama. The Warriors were found to have committed major breaches of the salary cap due to poor administration decisions. The NRL announced the club would be deducted four competition points and the club would also be assessed a A$430,000 fine. Those four points would cost the team a place in the finals.

Even at the age of 33 and after 13 years playing professional football, the 2007 season proved to be one of his career bests. In Round 14 Steve Price broke his own record of 'metres gained by a forward' playing against the Cronulla Sharks. Price's previous record was 272 metres; he eclipsed this by gaining 306 metres from 33 hit-ups. Seven weeks later in round 21 Price broke his own record again, this time against the Sydney Roosters where he ran for a total of 323 m. The Warriors finished the regular season strongly, sitting at the top end of the ladder on 4th position, although they struggled to perform come finals time and dropped out of the competition in the second week of the finals losing to the North Queensland Cowboys. However, Price's own personal performance throughout the year was duly recognised as he was awarded the Captain of the Year & Prop of the Year titles at the 2007 Dally M Awards. He ran 4,515 metres with the ball in 2007, more than any other forward in history.

In August 2008, Price was named in the preliminary 46-man Kangaroos squad for the 2008 Rugby League World Cup, and in October 2008 he was selected in the final 24-man Australia squad. He did not, however, play in the World Cup Final due to tearing his calf in the final training session before the Final which Australia lost to the Kiwis.

Price was eligible for England and New Zealand; however, he has stated he will not switch his allegiance from Australia.

In April 2009, he was named in the preliminary 25-man squad to represent Queensland in the opening State of Origin match for 2009.

On Sunday 3 May 2009 Price confirmed he would extend his NRL career to a 17th season after signing a one-year contract with the New Zealand Warriors. Already the NRL's oldest player in 2009, Price was 36 at the start of the 2010 season. He was selected for Australia in the one-off test match against New Zealand on 8 May 2009. In State of Origin 3, 2009, Price was involved in a fight with Brett White, in which he was knocked unconscious by a right hook from White, and while unconscious, he was lifted up by the jersey and dropped on his head by Justin Poore.

Price was replaced as the Warriors club captain for the 2010 season by Simon Mannering, in a move described by the club as building for the future.

On 6 April 2010, Price announced his retirement from rugby league at the conclusion of the 2010 NRL season.

On 29 June 2010, Price announced his immediate retirement. This was due to a heel injury that he picked up during the off-season. This injury did not heal correctly and resulted in three operations, meaning that he would be unable to take to the field at all during the 2010 NRL season. This meant that although 2010 would be his final season as a professional rugby league player, he would not play a single game.

Playing awards

Individual playing awards
2002: Dally M Captain of the Year
2004: Ron McAuliffe Medal – Queensland State of Origin player of the series
2004: Dally M Captain of the Year
2006: NZ Warriors Lion Red Player of Year
2007: Dally M Captain of the Year
2007: Dally M Prop of the Year
2007: NZ Warriors Lion Red Player of Year
NRL Records: Most meters gained by a forward (323m vs. Sydney Roosters. Round 21, 2007)

Team playing awards
1994: Minor Premiers (Canterbury-Bankstown Bulldogs)
1995: Premiers (Canterbury-Bankstown Bulldogs)
1998: Grand Finalists (Canterbury-Bankstown Bulldogs)
2004: Premiers (Canterbury-Bankstown Bulldogs) (did not actually play in the grand final due to injury)

Post-playing career
Price graduated from the Southern Cross University with a Masters in Business Administration in 2010 as the Outstanding Young Alumnus of the Year.

In the 2011 New Year Honours, Price was appointed a Member of the New Zealand Order of Merit for services to rugby league. The award citation read: "He began the role (as captain) following the club's worst-ever season and helped rebuild it to become one of the league’s best." "He played a mentoring role to less experienced players. In 2006 he led the team with honesty and integrity while it was investigated by the National Rugby League over salary cap breaches, and in 2007 he was awarded Captain of the Year and Prop of the Year at the Dally M Awards." "Mr Price has been described as 'the most loved Australian in New Zealand sporting history'."

Personal life
Price is the father of Giants Netball player Jamie-Lee Price.

References

Further reading

External links
NZ Warriors Profile
Bulldogs Profile
Steve Price Gone Fishing

1974 births
Living people
Australian rugby league players
Australian expatriate sportspeople in New Zealand
Australian expatriate rugby league players
Australian people of Welsh descent
Australia national rugby league team players
New Zealand Warriors players
New Zealand Warriors captains
Canterbury-Bankstown Bulldogs players
Queensland Rugby League State of Origin players
Prime Minister's XIII players
Members of the New Zealand Order of Merit
People from the Darling Downs
Rugby league players from Queensland
Rugby league props
Southern Cross University alumni
Prime Minister's XIII captains